The Overlanders Bridge is a bridge that spans the Thompson River in Kamloops, British Columbia. It connects Fortune Drive and Tranquille Road in the north with Victoria Street in the south. The bridge opened on November 22, 1961, becoming the third bridge to traverse the Thompson River in this location (1901, 1925). The bridge carries approximately 42,000 vehicles daily. The City of Kamloops rehabilitated the bridge in 2015 following reports indicating significant wear on both the bridge deck and the west sidewalk.

Overlanders was the winning entry, submitted by Joan Lyons, to a naming contest run by the Kamloops Sentinel newspaper.  The name commemorates the pioneers who travelled overland from Fort Garry, Manitoba to Kamloops in 1862. The incorrect name of Overlander  is in common use and previously appeared in official documentation before being corrected to Overlanders.

See also 
 List of bridges in Canada

References

Buildings and structures in Kamloops
Road bridges in British Columbia